Hamid Khorassani (born August 27, 1982), professionally known as Akira Corassani, is a retired Iranian-Swedish mixed martial artist who most recently competed as a Featherweight in the Ultimate Fighting Championship. A professional MMA competitor since 2007, Corassani has made a name for himself fighting mainly in Western Europe. He was a competitor on Spike TV's The Ultimate Fighter: Team Bisping vs. Team Miller as a member of Team Bisping.

Background
Corassani was born in Lund in Iranian-Azerbaijani family, southern Sweden.  His parents moved to Sweden from Iran around 1976. He began martial arts when he was six years old, Shotokan Karate became his discipline for 1 year until he switched over to Tae Kwon Do. He was playing football in his hometown team as well as pursuing his black belt in Tae Kwon Do. Corassani graduated fast and was considered a natural talent early on. At the age of 14 he became a Tae Kwon Do black belt to shortly after quit and pursue his football journey. Football became his main focus in life as he played in the highest youth league in Sweden. At the age of 22 Corassani found his way back to martial arts and he began training MMA. Corassani comes from an academic family and has four sibling who are all doctors. Corassani is vegan.  Corassani speaks seven different languages: Swedish, English, Spanish, Portuguese, Persian, Azeri and Turkish.

Career

Early career
In 2005 Corassani started training at a local MMA gym in Gothenburg where he lived at the time. He decided to dedicate his life to martial arts and only four months later he competed in his first grappling tournament where he took a silver medal. Up until his professional debut Corassani had 30 grappling matches and 12 boxing fights. Corassani began fighting professionally in 2007, and traveling all across Europe to compete. In his professional debut fight he challenged the Dutch heavyweight fighter Dion Staring. Corassani had travelled to Holland to corner his friend but heard about Straing's opponent pulling out. Corassani stepped up on the scale as 76 kg as his opponent weighed 102 kg. The fight was titled as an open weight fight. He built a record of 9–3 (1 NC) beating good names before his UFC debut. He moved to New York in 2011 and was a part of Team Renzo Gracie. In US he joined their MMA team coached by Ricardo Almeida with teammates such as Frankie Edgar, Edson Barboza, Eddie Alvarez, Corey Anderson and Marlon Moraes.

The Ultimate Fighter
In 2011, Corassani had signed with the UFC to compete on The Ultimate Fighter: Team Bisping vs. Team Miller. In the first episode, Corassani fought Brian Pearman to gain entry into the Ultimate Fighter house. Corassani defeated Pearman in the first round via KO. Corassani was selected as a part of Team Bisping, he was the second featherweight chosen for the team (fifth overall).

In episodes three through five, Corassani was shown multiple times in altercations with Team Mayhem fighter, Dustin Neace. The two would later be paired in a bout against each other in the preliminary round. During the fight, inside the first round, Neace applied a heel hook submission that looked like Corassani tapped to; however referee Herb Dean did not stop the fight and Corassani was released from the hold. Corassani went on to defeat Neace via a majority decision after two rounds. After the win Corassani moved onto the semi-finals.

Corassani was chosen to fight Team Mayhem fighter, Dennis Bermudez, in the semi-final round. The fight would determine who would move into the final round of the featherweight tournament. Though Corassani controlled throughout the fight with effective striking, scoring several knockdowns, Corassani lost the fight via submission (guillotine choke) in the first round. When the referee stopped the fight Akira had lost consciousness and had to be told that he lost the fight.

Ultimate Fighting Championship
Though Corassani lost in the semi-final round, and did not win the show, he signed an exclusive deal with the UFC. He was set to make his debut on December 3, 2011 at The Ultimate Fighter 14 Finale against Steven Siler. However, after an injury in training camp, Corassani was forced to pull out of the bout and was replaced by newcomer Josh Clopton.

Corassani was expected to make his UFC debut in his native Sweden against Jason Young on April 14, 2012 at UFC on Fuel TV 2. However Corassani pulled out of the bout due to injury.

Corassani won his UFC debut via split decision against Andy Ogle on September 29, 2012 at UFC on Fuel TV 5.

A bout with Robbie Peralta, previously linked to UFC 156, was moved April 6, 2013 at UFC on Fuel TV 9, after an illness sidelined Corassani for a time. He won the fight by unanimous decision.

Corassani was expected to face Mike Brown on August 17, 2013 at UFC Fight Night 26.  However, Corassani pulled out of the bout due to an injury and was replaced by Steven Siler.

Corassani faced Maximo Blanco on November 30, 2013 at The Ultimate Fighter 18 Finale. Early in the opening round Blanco landed an illegal knee to the head of Corassani when he had a knee and hand on the ground. Corassani was unable to continue, so he was rendered with the victory by disqualification. It was later revealed that the illegal knee had broken his nose in five different places.

Corassani faced Dustin Poirier at The Ultimate Fighter Nations Finale. He lost the back-and-forth fight via TKO in the second round. He was awarded his first Fight of the Night bonus for his efforts.

Corassani was expected to face Chan Sung Jung on October 4, 2014 at UFC Fight Night 53.  However, Jung pulled out of the bout citing a strained shoulder. and was replaced by Max Holloway.  Corassani lost the fight via knockout in the first round.

Corassani fought Sam Sicilia on January 24, 2015 at UFC on Fox: Gustafsson vs. Johnson. He lost the fight via KO in the first round.

On January 26, 2015, Corassani announced his retirement from MMA on his Facebook page, finishing with a 3–3 record inside the UFC.

Championships and accomplishments
 Ultimate Fighting Championship
 Fight of the Night (One time) vs. Dustin Poirier
MMAJunkie.com
2014 April Fight of the Month vs. Dustin Poirier

Mixed martial arts record

|-
|Loss
|align=center|12–6 (1)
|Sam Sicilia
|KO (punch) 
|UFC on Fox: Gustafsson vs. Johnson
|
|align=center|1
|align=center|3:26
|Stockholm, Sweden
|
|-
|Loss
|align=center|12–5 (1)
|Max Holloway
|KO (punches)
|UFC Fight Night: Nelson vs. Story
|
|align=center|1
|align=center|3:11
|Stockholm, Sweden
|
|-
|Loss
|align=center|12–4 (1)
|Dustin Poirier
|TKO (punches)
|The Ultimate Fighter Nations Finale: Bisping vs. Kennedy
|
|align=center|2
|align=center|0:42
|Quebec City, Quebec, Canada
|
|-
|Win
|align=center|12–3 (1)
|Maximo Blanco
|DQ (illegal knee)
|The Ultimate Fighter 18 Finale
|
|align=center|1
|align=center|0:25
|Las Vegas, Nevada, United States
|
|-
|Win
|align=center|11–3 (1)
|Robbie Peralta
|Decision (unanimous)
|UFC on Fuel TV: Mousasi vs. Latifi
|
|align=center|3
|align=center|5:00
|Stockholm, Sweden
|
|-
|Win
|align=center|10–3 (1)
|Andy Ogle
| Decision (split)
|UFC on Fuel TV: Struve vs. Miocic
|
|align=center|3
|align=center|5:00
|Nottingham, England
|
|-
|Loss
|align=center|9–3 (1)
|Paul Reed
|TKO (punches) 
|The Zone FC 8
|
|align=center|2
|align=center|3:28
|Gothenburg, Sweden
|
|-
|Win
|align=center|9–2 (1)
|Graham Turner
|Decision (unanimous)
|Superior Challenge 6
|
|align=center|3
|align=center|5:00
|Stockholm, Sweden
|
|-
|Win
|align=center|8–2 (1)
|Martin Begley
|Submission (scissor choke)
|Vision Fighting Championship 1
|
|align=center|1
|align=center|4:28
|Karlstad Municipality, Sweden
|
|-
|Win
|align=center|7–2 (1)
|Ivan Buchinger
|Decision (unanimous)
|Battle of Botnia 2
|
|align=center|3
|align=center|5:00
|Umeå, Sweden
|
|-
|Win
|align=center|6–2 (1)
|Peter Mettler
|TKO (punches)
|Superior Challenge 4
|
|align=center|1
|align=center|3:42
|Stockholm, Sweden
|
|-
|NC
|align=center|5–2 (1)
|Felipe Enomoto
|No Contest (overturned)
|Gods of War 5: Empathy
|
|align=center|3
|align=center|5:00
|Baumholder, Germany
|
|-
|Win
|align=center|5–2
|Dominique Stetefeld
|Submission (arm-triangle choke)
|La Onda Fight Night 2
|
|align=center|3
|align=center|5:00
|Magdeburg, Germany
|
|-
|Win
|align=center|4–2
|Grzegorz Tredowski
|Decision (unanimous)
|United Glory 10: The Battle of Arnhem
|
|align=center|3
|align=center|5:00
|Arnhem, Netherlands
|
|-
|Loss
|align=center|3–2
|Darin Hughes
|TKO (punches)
|Superior Challenge 1
|
|align=center|2
|align=center|4:10
|Stockholm, Sweden
|
|-
|Win
|align=center|3–1
|Jukka Kuitunen
|Decision (unanimous)
|Shooto Finland: Chicago Collision III
|
|align=center|2
|align=center|5:00
|Lahti, Finland
|
|-
|Win
|align=center|2–1
|Raymond Jarman
|Submission (triangle choke)
|United Glory 5: Stronger
|
|align=center|2
|align=center|N/A
|Amersfoort, Netherlands
|
|-
|Win
|align=center|1–1
|Jaroslav Poborsky
|Decision (unanimous)
| Gods of War 1: Rise of the Warriors
|
|align=center|3
|align=center|5:00
|Erdesbach, Germany
|Welterweight debut.
|-
|Loss
|align=center|0–1
|Dion Staring
|TKO (corner stoppage)
|United Glory 3: Upside Down
|
|align=center|2
|align=center|2:52
|Amersfoort, Netherlands
|Light Heavyweight bout.

Mixed martial arts exhibition record

| Loss
|align=center| 2-1
|  Dennis Bermudez
| Submission (guillotine choke)
| The Ultimate Fighter: Team Bisping vs. Team Miller
| 
|align=center| 1
| align=center| 3:12
| Las Vegas, Nevada, United States
| 
|-
| Win
|align=center| 2–0
|  Dustin Neace
| Decision (majority)
| The Ultimate Fighter: Team Bisping vs. Team Miller
| 
|align=center| 2
|align=center| 5:00
| Las Vegas, Nevada, United States
| 
|-
| Win
|align=center| 1–0
| Brian Pearman
| KO (punches)
| The Ultimate Fighter: Team Bisping vs. Team Miller
| 
|align=center| 1
|align=center| 4:17
| Las Vegas, Nevada, United States
|

Amateur mixed martial arts record 

|-
| Win
|align=center| 3–0
| Henrik Olsen
| Decision (unanimous)
| Shooters MMA: Frederikssund Brawl 2
| 
|align=center| 3
|align=center| 5:00
| Frederikssund, Denmark
| 
|-
| Win
|align=center| 2–0
| Arash Dastnai
| Decision (unanimous)
| Shooters MMA: Fightergalla 2
| 
|align=center| 3
|align=center| 5:00
| Odense, Denmark
| 
|-
| Win
|align=center| 1–0
| Arild Skagseth
| Decision (unanimous)
| Cage Challenge 2
| 
|align=center| 1
|align=center| 5:00
| Stockholm, Sweden
|

References

External links
 
 

1982 births
Living people
Swedish male taekwondo practitioners
Swedish male mixed martial artists
Iranian male taekwondo practitioners
Iranian male mixed martial artists
Featherweight mixed martial artists
Mixed martial artists utilizing taekwondo
Mixed martial artists utilizing Brazilian jiu-jitsu
Swedish practitioners of Brazilian jiu-jitsu
Iranian practitioners of Brazilian jiu-jitsu
Swedish people of Iranian descent
Sportspeople from Gothenburg
Sportspeople of Iranian descent
Ultimate Fighting Championship male fighters